Therese Wallter is a Swedish team handball player, playing for the club Skövde HF and for the Swedish women's national handball team.

At the 2010 European Women's Handball Championship she reached the final and won a silver medal with the Swedish team.

References

Year of birth missing (living people)
Living people
Swedish female handball players